Elections for the House of Representatives of the Philippines were held on May 10, 2004. Being held together with presidential election, the party of the incumbent president Gloria Macapagal Arroyo, Lakas-Christian Muslim Democrats, and by extension the administration-led coalition, the Koalisyon ng Katapatan at Karanasan sa Kinabukasan (K4), won majority of the seats in the House of Representatives.

The elected representatives served in the 13th Congress from 2004 to 2007.

Results

District elections

Party-list election

See also
13th Congress of the Philippines

References

Notes

  

2004
2004 elections in Asia
2004 in the Philippines
2004 Philippine general election
May 2004 events in the Philippines